Hartford Municipal Airport  is a public use airport in Washington County, Wisconsin, United States. The airport is owned by and located two nautical miles (4 km) northwest of the central business district of the city of Hartford. It is included in the Federal Aviation Administration (FAA) National Plan of Integrated Airport Systems for 2021–2025, in which it is categorized as a local general aviation facility.

Although many U.S. airports use the same three-letter location identifier for the FAA and IATA, this facility is assigned HXF by the FAA but has no designation from the IATA.

Facilities and aircraft 
Hartford Municipal Airport covers an area of 378 acres (153 ha) at an elevation of 1,069 feet (326 m) above mean sea level. It has two runways: 9/27 is 3,401 by 75 feet (1,037 x 23 m) with an asphalt surface and approved GPS approaches, and runway 18/36 is 2,231 by 196 feet (680 x 60 m) with a turf surface.

For the 12-month period ending August 10, 2022, the airport had 15,500 aircraft operations, an average of 42 per day: 97% general aviation, 3% air taxi and less than 1% military. In  January 2023, there were 91 aircraft based at this airport: 75 single-engine, 1 multi-engine, 1 jet, 3 helicopter and 11 glider.

See also
 List of airports in Wisconsin

References

External links 
 Airport page at City of Hartford website
  at Wisconsin DOT Airport Directory
 

Airports in Wisconsin
Buildings and structures in Washington County, Wisconsin
Transportation in Washington County, Wisconsin